Nora Sopková is a Czech set decorator. She was nominated for an Academy Award in the category Best Production Design for the film Jojo Rabbit.

Selected filmography 
 Jojo Rabbit (2019; co-nominated for an Oscar with Ra Vincent)

References

External links 

Living people
Place of birth missing (living people)
Year of birth missing (living people)
Czech set decorators